Randy Kenneth MacGregor (born July 9, 1953) is a former professional ice hockey player.  MacGregor played Junior Hockey in Ontario, before going pro with the Broome Dusters (Binghamton, NY) of the North American Hockey League in 1973.  He skated much of his professional career in Binghamton.

MacGregor would make the transition with the Dusters in 1977 into the American Hockey League.  The Dusters became the Whalers in 1980 and MacGregor would spend part of the 1980–81 season in Klagenfurt, Austria.  He would return to Binghamton later that season, but would end his career in 1984 in Glens Falls, NY with the Adirondack Red Wings.

Following his playing days, MacGregor returned to his adopted hometown of Binghamton.  He is a contractor and has been a hockey coach with the Southern Tier Hockey Association and Syracuse Stars minor hockey systems.  MacGregor continues to reside in the area; now calling Vestal home.   He has two adult sons Justin and Dillon.

Awards
In 1984, MacGregor's #11 became the only jersey in Binghamton Hockey History to be retired to the rafters.  (It was unretired by the Rangers' organization in 1991)

In 1998, MacGregor was the first player inducted into the Binghamton Hockey Hall of Fame.  Also part of the Hall of Fame's inaugural class was Broome Dusters' founder Jim Matthews and Detroit Red Wings General Manager Ken Holland, who spent much of his playing career in Binghamton.

Career statistics

Regular season and playoffs

External links
 

1953 births
Living people
Adirondack Red Wings players
Binghamton Dusters players
Binghamton Whalers players
Canadian ice hockey forwards
Hartford Whalers players
Sportspeople from London, Ontario
Muskegon Mohawks players
Ice hockey people from Ontario
Undrafted National Hockey League players